Belmont is a historic home located at Bensalem, Bucks County, Pennsylvania. It was built about 1850, and is an "L"-shaped, 2 3/4-story, stuccoed stone dwelling in the Greek Revival style. It has a hipped roof and features a one-story, wraparound verandah.  The home was built for a mill owner by the name of Paul Townsend on a farm property in 1850 and owned until his death in 1890.  The home is across the street from Neshaminy Mall on Bristol Road.

It was added to the National Register of Historic Places in 1988.

References

Houses on the National Register of Historic Places in Pennsylvania
Greek Revival houses in Pennsylvania
Houses completed in 1850
Houses in Bucks County, Pennsylvania
National Register of Historic Places in Bucks County, Pennsylvania
Bensalem Township, Pennsylvania